Sympodium is a genus of soft corals in the family Xeniidae.

Species
The World Register of Marine Species lists the following species:

Sympodium abyssorum Danielssen, 1887
Sympodium caeruleum Ehrenberg, 1834
Sympodium fuliginosum Ehrenberg, 1834
Sympodium hyalinum Grieg, 1887
Sympodium norvegicum Koren & Danielssen, 1883
Sympodium punctatum May, 1898
Sympodium splendens Thomson & Henderson, 1906
Sympodium tamatavense Cohn, 1907

References

Xeniidae
Octocorallia genera
Taxa named by Christian Gottfried Ehrenberg